Madhaveeyam The Kundanadi is a 2019 Malayalam-language drama/romance genre film produced by Sudheer Kumar and directed by Thejas Perumanna, starring Vineeth and Pranaya in leading roles along with Mamukkoya and Geetha Vijayan.

Cast
Vineeth as Madhav
Mamukkoya
Kuttyedathi Vilasini
Ambika Mohan
Pranaya
Geetha Vijan
Babu Nambuthiri
Thejas Perumanna

References

External links

പ്രണയമൊരു തൂമഞ്ഞായ്...
പുതുമ നിറഞ്ഞ പ്രണയകഥയുമായി 'മാധവീയം'
മാധവീയം

2010s Malayalam-language films
Indian action thriller films
Indian mystery thriller films
Films shot in Kerala